Julia Marcus may refer to:

 Julia Marcus (dancer) (1905–2002), Swiss dancer and choreographer
 Julia L. Marcus, American public health researcher and epidemiologist